"Same Song" is a song by American rap group Digital Underground—featuring future music legend, Tupac Shakur, in his recording debut—from the soundtrack for the movie, Nothing But Trouble. The song is included on their EP album, This Is an EP Release, as well as on the  Tupac: Resurrection soundtrack.

The video starts off with a hearse driving into a drive-in theater, showing clips from Nothing but Trouble. The Digital Underground crew leaves the hearse. Shock G, portraying an American rock musician, raps the first verse. Shock G's alter ego, Humpty Hump—alternately portraying an Arab, an Asian, and an Eskimo—raps the second and fifth verses. Money B, portraying an orthodox Jew, raps the third verse. Shock G raps the fourth verse, portraying a Jamaican rasta, and Tupac raps the final verse, portraying an African king.

Dan Aykroyd appears, portraying a Scottish bagpipe artist, as well as a Los Angeles gang member and a man in middle eastern clothing, while Dr. Dre and Eazy-E also make cameo appearances.

Charts

Weekly charts

References

1991 singles
Digital Underground songs
Tommy Boy Records singles
1991 songs
Songs written by Tupac Shakur
Warner Records singles